Trouble in the Home is the second album by English band Thrashing Doves. It was released in 1989 on LP and CD by A&M Records and has so far not been reissued yet.

Track listing
All tracks written by Brian Foreman & Ken Foreman.
"Reprobate's Hymn" – 4:28
"Angel Visit" – 3:17
"Sister Deals" – 3:49
"Lorelei" – 4:32
"Trouble in the Home" – 4:29
"Another Deadly Sunset" – 4:23
"Mary Mary" – 4:05
"Like Heartbreak" – 3:31
"Late Show" – 3:26
"Candy Woman" – 5:16
"Domestic Rainchild" – 2:38

B-sides
"Jesus on the Payroll #2" (second version with slightly different lyrics)
"She Do Me"
"Babe Like a Rock"
"Girl Called Houdini"
"You Don't Believe in Me, Do You

Personnel
Ken Foreman - vocals, lead guitar
Brian Foreman - synthesizer, harmonica, backing vocals
Ian Button - guitar, bass guitar, backing vocals
Kevin Sargent - drums, percussion, backing vocals
David Palmer - drums
James Eller - bass guitar
Gail Ann Dorsey - bass guitar, vocals
Angie Giles - backing vocals
Zeeteah Massiah - backing vocals
Barry Wickens - lead violin

Notes 

1989 albums
Thrashing Doves albums
A&M Records albums